This Time It's for Real was the second album by New Jersey Rock / R&B band Southside Johnny and the Asbury Jukes, featuring three compositions by Bruce Springsteen and Steve Van Zandt, as well as an additional five by the latter. Like their first album, I Don't Want To Go Home, there are a number of guest artists and duets, a trend that would be dropped for their next album, Hearts of Stone. "Check Mr. Popeye" features Kenny "Popeye" Pentifallo on vocals with The Coasters on background vocals. The track "First Night" features The Satins on background vocals and Steven Van Zandt on duet vocals. "Little Girl So Fine" features background vocals by The Drifters. Another highlight is a cover of Aretha Franklin's "Without Love".

According to Van Zandt, the two new Springsteen/Van Zandt compositions ("Love on the Wrong Side of Town" and "Little Girl So Fine") were written, at least in part, during recording sessions at Columbia Recording Studio in December 1976. Versions of both songs with unfinished lyrics appear on Van Zandt's compilation album The Early Work, recorded in 1976-77. A third composition, "When You Dance", was written by the pair when they were both members of the Bruce Springsteen Band in 1971.

The front cover photograph of the band was taken at Minetta Street, Greenwich Village, New York City.

Track listing
 "This Time It's for Real" (Steven Van Zandt) - 4:07
 "Without Love" (Carolyn Franklin, Ivory Joe Hunter) - 4:32
 "Check Mr. Popeye" (Dolores Johnson) - 3:56
 "First Night" (Steven Van Zandt) - 4:38
 "She Got Me Where She Wants Me" (Steven Van Zandt) - 4:06
 "Some Things Just Don't Change" (Steven Van Zandt) - 3:39
 "Little Girl So Fine" (Bruce Springsteen, Steven Van Zandt) - 3:51
 "I Ain't Got the Fever No More" (Steven Van Zandt) - 5:29
 "Love on the Wrong Side of Town" (Bruce Springsteen, Steven Van Zandt) - 3:11
 "When You Dance" (Bruce Springsteen, Steven Van Zandt) - 5:25

Personnel

Musicians

 Southside Johnny – lead vocals, harmonica
 Al Berger - bass, vocals
 Eddie Manion - baritone saxophone, vocals
 Kevin Kavanaugh - piano, vocals
 Kenny "Popeye" Pentifallo - drums, tambourine, vocals ("Check Mr. Popeye")
 Billy Rush (credited as Little Willie Rush) - guitar, vocals
 Richie Rosenberg - trombone, vocals
 Tony Palligrosi - trumpet, vocals
 Carlo Novi - tenor saxophone, vocals
 Steven Van Zandt (credited as SMS) - guitar, vocals (duet "First Night")
 Ernest 'Boom' Carter - conga, tympani
 Bobby Malach - tenor saxophone ("Love On the Wrong Side of Town")
 The Drifters - background vocals ("Little Girl So Fine")
 Charlie Thomas
 Doe Greene
 Ellsbury Hobbs
 Don Thomas
 The Coasters - background vocals ("Check Mr. Popeye")
 Carl Gardner
 Earl Carroll
 Jimmy Norman
 Ronnie Bright
 The Satins - background vocals ("First Night")
 Fred Parris
 Richard Freeman
 James Curtis
 Nate Marshall
 Sugar's Strings:
 Joe Parente - conductor
 Florence Rosenwig - violin
 Marion Head - violin
 David Madison - violin
 Chock Parker - violin
 Barbara Sonies - violin
 Diane Barnets - violin
 Nardo Poy - viola
 Pete Rosato - viola
 Davis Barnett - viola

Production
 Steven Van Zandt - producer
 Don Meehan - engineer
 Ken Robertson - assistant engineer
 Stan Kalina - mastering

References

1977 albums
Albums produced by Steven Van Zandt
Epic Records albums
Southside Johnny & The Asbury Jukes albums